Chamber of Deputies was a parliamentary body in France in the nineteenth and twentieth centuries:
 1814–1848 during the Bourbon Restoration and the July Monarchy, the Chamber of Deputies was the lower house of the French Parliament, elected by census suffrage.
 1875–1940 during the French Third Republic, the Chamber of Deputies was the legislative assembly of the French Parliament, elected by universal suffrage. When reunited with the Senate in Versailles, the French Parliament was called the National Assembly (Assemblée nationale) and carried out the election of the president of the French Republic.

During the Bourbon Restoration

Created by the Charter of 1814 and replacing the Corps législatif, which existed under the First French Empire, the Chamber of Deputies was composed of individuals elected by census suffrage. Its role was to discuss laws and, most importantly, to vote taxes. According to the Charter, deputies were elected for five years, with one-fifth renewed each year. Deputies needed to be 40 years old and to pay one thousand francs in direct contributions.

Government ministers could be chosen from among the deputies, and this resulted in giving the Restoration government a slight, albeit minor, parliamentary and liberal character.

During the Hundred Days (les cent jours) return of Napoleon I in 1815, under the terms of the Additional Act to the Constitutions of the Empire, the Chamber of Deputies was briefly replaced by a Chamber of Representatives (Chambre des représentants). This body was dissolved upon the entry of Coalition troops into Paris on 7 July.

For the period 1815–1816, the (then) Ultra-royalist chamber was referred to as the Chambre introuvable.

During the July Monarchy

The Chamber of Deputies was elected by census suffrage according to the Charter of 1830. The political life of the July Monarchy was defined by the split within the Chamber of Deputies between the progressive movement (considered the Charter as a starting point) and the conservative wing (who refused any further modifications). Although both parties traded power in the initial stages, by 1840 the conservative members around François Guizot had seized control.

From 1830, deputies were elected for five years. They needed to be 30 years old and to pay 500 francs in direct contributions.

The king convoked the chamber every year, and he had the power to extend the parliamentary session or to dissolve the chamber, although in the latter case he was required to convoke a new chamber in three months time.

In 1852, the Chamber of Deputies retook the name Corps législatif.

See also
Cabinet of France
Constitution of France
French Parliament
History of France
National Assembly (French Fourth Republic)
National Assembly (France) (Fifth Republic)
Politics of France

Historical legislatures in France
Defunct lower houses
1814 establishments in France
1848 disestablishments in France
1875 establishments in France
1940 disestablishments in France